

Hubertus-Maria Ritter von Heigl (10 November 1897 – 24 January 1985) was a general in the Wehrmacht of Nazi Germany during World War II. He was a recipient of the Knight's Cross of the Iron Cross.

Awards and decorations

 Knight's Cross of the Iron Cross on 13 January 1942 as Oberstleutnant and commander of Pionier-Bataillon 70 (motorisiert)

References

Citations

Bibliography

 

1897 births
1985 deaths
Major generals of the German Army (Wehrmacht)
German Army personnel of World War I
Recipients of the clasp to the Iron Cross, 1st class
Knights of the Military Order of Max Joseph
Recipients of the Knight's Cross of the Iron Cross
German prisoners of war in World War II held by the United Kingdom
Military personnel from Bavaria
People from Kelheim (district)